KBRT (740 AM, known on-air as KBRITE) is a Southern Californian Christian radio station. It airs Christian talk radio programming from Costa Mesa, California to Los Angeles, Orange County, the Inland Empire, San Diego, and Santa Barbara.  The station broadcast at 10,000 watts sunrise to sunset at 740 kHz. On February 28, 2013, when KBRT moved to a new transmitter site near Corona, California, started broadcasting at 50,000 watts sunrise to sunset, and had the city of license changed to Costa Mesa.  The studio and business offices remain located in Costa Mesa. KBRT is a Class D station broadcasting on the Canadian clear-channel frequency of 740 AM. (CFZM in Toronto, Ontario, Canada is the dominant North-American station on the frequency.)

KBRT is licensed by the U.S. Federal Communications Commission to broadcast in the HD (hybrid) format.

History
The station went on air in 1952.  It was founded by entrepreneur John H. Poole as KBIG. Poole had worked at KEZY in Anaheim, and was founder of KBIC-TV (now KWHY-TV) in Los Angeles. Later, he would own KBIG-FM.

Studios were located at the transmitter site on Avalon, and later on the mainland coast.

From the beginning, there were contentious disagreements with co-channel KCBS in San Francisco over interference between the stations. Much of the path between stations' wavefronts was over highly conductive seawater.

According to the July 28, 1979 issue of Billboard Magazine, Bonneville Communications owned KBRT prior to the sale to Crawford Broadcasting.  Bonneville, owned by the Church of Jesus Christ of Latter-day Saints (LDS), has dabbled on and off in the Los Angeles radio market.  Bonneville also used to own KSWD, "The Sound" at 100.3 FM.  After changing call signs from KBIG, KBRT was a mixture of secular and Christian music, with all programming taped, and all song "intros and outros" recorded by professional announcers; there was no live, "on-air" talent until after changing over to a completely Christian music format.

1980s
In 1980, the station switched to the Talk/Christian format after being purchased by Donald Crawford of Crawford Broadcasting when the assets of the original Crawford Broadcasting were split up among the heirs of its founder, evangelist Percy Crawford.  Just prior to the switch, KBRT played Contemporary Christian Music from sunrise to sunset.  The daily sign-on began with a recording of a man's voice: "Good morning.  This is K-B-R-T Avalon, and we now begin another day of broadcasting over Southern California.  K-B-R-T radio broadcasts on an assigned frequency of 740 kilohertz with a power output of 10,000 watts by authority of the Federal Communications Commission.  K-B-R-T's transmitter is located on Santa Catalina Island, and is operated by Kiertron, Incorporated."  (Note: Disc jockeys made multiple mentions of "Transmitter Tom," who lived on Catalina Island, and oversaw the station's transmitter.)

Air personalities have included Clark Race, Johnny Magnus, Paul McGuire, Rich Buhler, Dave Sebastian Williams and Program Director, Mike Trout.  Magnus featured his trademark "Weather With a Beat," where he would list U.S. and world city temperatures to an upbeat instrumental background. A typical background music track for "Weather With a Beat" was Count Basie's version of Neal Hefti's tune, "Cute", featuring Frank Wess on flute. Previously, KBRT was known as KBIG, airing Easy Listening music.

2000s
Contractors cutting a steel antenna cable with a gas-powered circular saw caused the wildfire that began on May 10, 2007.  KBRT had to shut down the transmitter, which was not damaged. Until the transmitter was repaired, the station aired only on KBRT740.com.

Starting on September 19, 2011, KBRT featured David Housholder, Orange County author and pastor, and Roger Marsh in the 3pm-5pm drive-home slot, with "The Bottom Line", a current events show with features in legal, educational, health, and finance segments, replacing "Talk from the Heart" with Rich Buhler, previously hosted by Paul McGuire.  Housholder exited "The Bottom Line" in April 2013.  "The Bottom Line" reaches most AM radios in California, since it is syndicated on KCBC 770 AM in the Sacramento/Bay Area region.

References

External links

CBS story citing KBRT as the cause of the MAY '07 fire

BRT
BRT
HD Radio stations
Radio stations established in 1952
1952 establishments in California
BRT